The Diourbel Region (Serer and Cangin: Jurbel) is a region of Senegal.  The regional capital is the city of Diourbel.  The region corresponds roughly to the precolonial Kingdom of Bawol and is still called by that name. Bawol (or Baol) is an ancient kingdom formerly ruled by the Joof family, one of the members of the Serer ethnic group found in Senegambia. Inhabitants of the area are called Bawol-Bawol which takes its name from the Serer mode of pluralisation, other examples being : Sine-Sine or Siin-Siin (inhabitants of Sine), Saloum-Saloum (inhabitants of Saloum), etc. The population is primarily comprised by the Serer people especially those from the Cangin group, the Safene in particular. The Serers are believed to be the original inhabitants of this area. The Wolof and other ethnic groups are also present. The Diourbel Region is rich in history and it is where the Cekeen Tumulus are located.  Scholars such as Charles Becker, Henry Gravrand, and Victor Martin suggest that these monuments were built by the Serer people and form part of the Serer tumulus of Baol (see also Senegambian stone circles). They are some of the most sacred sites in Serer religion. The Département of Mbacke also includes Murid Islamic Sufi order's holy city of Touba. The installation of this order in Serer country is a controversial one, especially among those Serers who adhere to the tenets of Serer religion (see Serer history (medieval era to present). However, some Serers are also Muslims and have headed this religious order.

Départements
The Diourbel Region is composed of three départements:
Bambey Département
Diourbel Département
Mbacké Département

References

External links
 Région de Diourbel: Agence Régional de Développement.

 
Regions of Senegal